George Leo Ekaitis (July 15, 1906 – November 14, 1960) was an American college football player and coach and boxer. He attended Western Maryland College (now known as McDaniel College) where he played football and won the NCAA lightweight boxing championship before graduating in 1931. He served as the head football coach at Washington College in Chestertown, Maryland from 1933 to 1941 and 1946 to 1947. He also coached track and lacrosse at Washington College. He later coached football at Atlantic City High School in Atlantic City, New Jersey.

Ekaitis committed suicide in 1960. He was inducted into the Washington College Hall of Fame in 1984.

References

1906 births
1960 suicides
American football quarterbacks
McDaniel Green Terror football players
McDaniel Green Terror men's lacrosse players
Washington College Shoremen and Shorewomen athletic directors
Washington College Shoremen football coaches
Washington College Shoremen lacrosse coaches
College boxers in the United States
College track and field coaches in the United States
High school football coaches in New Jersey
People from Donora, Pennsylvania
Suicides by hanging in New Jersey